Yam Roll (or the long title, The Very Good Adventures of Yam Roll in Happy Kingdom) is a Canadian animated television series created by Jono Howard and Jon Izen for CBC Television. Produced by March Entertainment, the series premiered on February 6, 2006, airing on Saturday at 10:00am and 10:17am on local CBC channels. The pilot short was seen on the last episode of Maple Shorts in 2004, then with a few segments on Shorts in a Bunch in 2007.

Premise
Yam Roll features a cast of animated sushi characters, and other anthropomorphic instances of Japanese cuisine, all living in Happy Kingdom, a prosperous city which is upset quite often by monsters.

Quoting from March Entertainment's site:

With the help of his wise Zen master, Katcho Miso (an old lump of salty bean paste), his sidekick and best friend Ebi-san (a severely hyperactive shrimp), and the rest of his motley maritime crew, Yam Roll's life is always an exciting ride.

Characters
 Yam Roll: A taxicab driver by profession who wears a cowboy hat and boots. He is portrayed as an orange yam wrapped in rice, his body being circular in appearance, with stick-like arms and legs. Yam Roll is bestowed with a certain degree of super powers thanks to his instructor Katcho and the powers of Mount Foopi. These powers allow him to fly, lift incredibly heavy objects, and change form (into a door, a table, a potato masher, etc.). But despite his powers, Yam Roll leads a mostly normal life. Well, as normal as life gets in Happy Kingdom. Voiced by Lee Tockar.
Ebi: Ebi-San is Yam Roll's best friend and confidant. He is a boiled shrimp, who wears a band around his "head" and sandals. Ebi is extremely enthusiastic and excitable, and always tries to force Yam Roll into some escapade or other, often with dangerous and embarrassing results. Ebi is never happy to sit still and is constantly bouncing off the walls with energy. Voiced by Carlos Diaz.
Edamame: Edamame Legume is another one of Yam Roll's best friends, a soybean lightly dusted with sea salt. Unlike most of the characters in Yam Roll, Edamame has no arms. Instead, he uses his two legs as arms instead.
Tamago: Poor Tamago is forced to wear a very heavy and rare omelette on his back all the time. This unfortunate impediment leaves him bitter and emotional, and he constantly complains about the strain on his back (and any other issues that happen to be plaguing him). He tags along with Yam Roll, Ebi and Edamame on their adventures, but never without his fair share of complaints. Voiced by Joe Pingue.
Minamiko: Minamiko is Yam Roll's main love interest, a spicy tuna roll who draws the eye of almost every man in Happy Kingdom. Unfortunately for Yam Roll, Minamiko is practically unaware he exists, even though he consistently saves her from the clutches of evil monsters. Her popularity nets her many dates around the city, and Yam Roll is often low on her list. Yam Roll's rival, Milk Man — a carton of milk — is usually Minamiko's main boyfriend. Voiced by Sunday Muse.
Katcho: Katcho Miso is "an old lump of salty miso bean paste" and Yam Roll's Zen master, who lives atop Mount Foopi. He often has wise teachings for his only pupil, and occasionally a good whack or two from his magic staff. But most of the time Katcho watches from a distance as Yam Roll faces his daily tribulations, preferring to observe instead of interfering.
Spicy Tuna Cone:  Another boyfriend of Minamiko, Spicy Tuna Cone appears to be mayor of the Happy Kingdom, and sometimes EmCees at Hakamaryoke's Karaoke's bar.  He also seems to be a minor friend of Yam Roll.
Genki: A girl who would be happy to date Yam Roll. She is kindhearted and loves stuffed animals.

Yam Roll also hosts a large variety of other sushi characters, including Yam Roll's friends, enemies, and random passers-by. Each character is wittingly named after their sushi names (e.g., Ebi, which means "shrimp" in Japanese).

Episodes

References

External links
CBC: Yam Roll page 
Yam Roll Blog  official show blog site

International broadcast
The series began first broadcast on Cartoon Network and Boomerang in the United States in fall 2006. After a short hiatus, it moved to Qubo and BBC Kids in 2011 until 2016. It was even broadcast on CITV and Jetix and Minimax in Central and Eastern Europe and NHK in Japan.

2000s Canadian animated television series
2006 Canadian television series debuts
2006 Canadian television series endings
Canadian children's animated comedy television series
CBC Television original programming
Canadian flash animated television series
Television shows filmed in Greater Sudbury
Canadian television series with live action and animation
English-language television shows